Prey is a commune in the Vosges department in Grand Est in northeastern France.

Geography 
Prey is a small rural commune positioned halfway between Bruyères and Docelles.

Distinguished son 
Jean Antoine Villemin 1827 - 1892 who identified the infectious nature of tuberculosis in his publication "études sur la tuberculose", was born at Prey.   Mainstream medicine was slow to recognise the significance of Villemin's work.

Villemin is also credited with having invented the term "antibiotique" (antibiotic), though this assertion is contested by some English speakers who say the term was first coined only in the twentieth century by a Ukrainian American named Selman Waksman.

See also 
 Communes of the Vosges department

References 

Communes of Vosges (department)